

Number Five is a studio album by jazz trumpeter, composer, and arranger, Tom Harrell, released in May 2012 by HighNote.

Overview
This is the fifth album by Harrell's Quintet, which includes Wayne Escoffery on sax, Danny Grissett on piano, Ugonna Okegwo on bass, and Johnathan Blake on drums. Four tracks feature the full quintet. The other tracks feature arrangements in quartet, trio and duo, and on two tracks Harrell performs solo. This is a departure from Harrell's previous four albums, in which 35 of the total 36 tracks featured the full quintet. Four tracks were recorded with no prior rehearsal – exhibiting the confidence and tightness of the group.

Reception
JazzTimes noted the group's chemistry and called the album "the most adventurous and eclectic of the five he's done for HighNote." AllMusic stated that Harrell "continues to surprise" with this album.

Track listing

Personnel
Credits adapted from AllMusic.

Tom Harrell – composer, primary artist, producer, flugelhorn, trumpet
Wayne Escoffery – producer, sax (tenor)
Danny Grissett – piano, fender rhodes
Ugonna Okegwo – bass
Johnathan Blake – drums
Tadd Dameron – composer
Gene De Paul – composer
Frank Paparelli – composer
Joe Fields – executive producer
Angela Harrell – producer
Rich Lamb – assistant engineer
Mike Marciano – engineer
Salvatore Corso – photography
John Kelman – liner notes
Keiji Obata – design

References 

2012 albums
Tom Harrell albums
HighNote Records albums